Joseph King may refer to:
Joseph King (politician) (1860–1943), British politician, Member of Parliament for North Somerset 1910–1918
Joseph King (actor), American actor
Joseph E. King (born 1945), American politician in the state of Washington
Joseph F. King (born 1948), US Customs agent
J. C. King (Joseph Caldwell King, 1900–1977), CIA officer

See also
Joe King (disambiguation)